Natica vittellus is a species of predatory sea snail, a marine gastropod mollusk in the family Naticidae, the moon snails.

Distribution
This species occurs in the Indian Ocean off Madagascar.

References

 Hollman M. (2008) Naticidae. In Poppe G.T. (ed.) Philippine marine mollusks, vol. 1: 482-501, pls 186-195. Hackenheim: Conchbooks.

Naticidae
Gastropods described in 1758
Taxa named by Carl Linnaeus